Transport in Quebec City uses a variety of modes.

Tramway

A tramway is currently under development.

Roads
Two bridges (the Quebec Bridge and Pierre Laporte Bridge) and a ferry service connect the city with Lévis and its suburbs along the south shore of the Saint Lawrence River. The Orleans Island Bridge links Quebec City with pastoral Orleans Island.

Quebec City is an important hub in the province's autoroute system, as well as boasting one of the highest "expressway lane kilometres per 1000 persons" in the country (1.10 km), behind Calgary (1.74), Hamilton (1.61) and Edmonton (1.24).

Sea
The Port of Quebec is a seaport on the St. Lawrence with facilities in the first, fifth and sixth boroughs.

References

Quebec City
Transport in Canada